Gerhart Rudolf Baum (born 28 October 1932) is a German politician of the Free Democratic Party (FDP) and a lawyer.

Early life and education
Gerhart Baum was born to a German father and a Russian mother. His paternal ancestors, whose roots lay in Plauen in the Saxon Vogtland, originally worked as craftsmen before later generations were able to pursue academic professions. His mother was born in Moscow; her own mother was from Łódź and of Polish ethnicity and her Ukrainian-born father was originally from Kharkiv. In 1917, her family had fled from Russia to Germany as a result of the October Revolution. In his childhood Baum was a forced member of the Hitler Youth. After the bombing of Dresden, his mother left the city in February 1945 and fled with her three children to Lake Tegernsee in Bavaria. His father, who had fought on the Eastern Front during the war, was captured by the Soviets and later died in captivity. In 1950, Baum's family moved to Cologne.

After graduating from school in 1953, Baum studied law at the University of Cologne and subsequently worked as a lawyer.

Political career
Baum been a member of the FDP since 1954.

From 1978 until 1982, Baum served as Federal Minister of the Interior in the government of Chancellor Helmut Schmidt. During his time in office, he liberalized routine loyalty investigations of candidates for public‐service jobs, a controversial practice intended to control radical activity that had led to a profound and disruptive debate about the extent of democracy in West Germany. In 1981, with the backing of economics minister Otto Graf Lambsdorff, he asked the German car industry to agree on goals to tighten emissions standards and cut fuel consumption on a voluntary basis.

Following the collapse of the social–liberal coalition, Baum – alongside fellow FDP ministers Hans-Dietrich Genscher, Lambsdorff, and Josef Ertl – stepped down on 18 September 1982.

Life after politics
Between 2000 and 2001, Baum and two other lawyers together represented about three-quarters of the Air France Flight 4590 crash victims' families. In May 2001, they reached a monetary settlement for compensation from Air France. According to people familiar with terms of the settlement, it was between $100 million and $125 million (114.1 million euros and 142.6 million euros), an extraordinarily high sum for a plane-crash settlement in Europe at the time.

From 2001 to 2003, Baum served as UN Special Rapporteur on the Situation of Human Rights in Sudan.

In 2006, Baum presented a press freedom award to Berliner Zeitung for its resistance to an unpopular takeover by David Montgomery’s Mecom Group.

In 2009, Germany's national railway company Deutsche Bahn commissioned Baum and former justice minister Herta Däubler-Gmelin with investigating allegations according to which the company had, in violation of privacy laws and corporate guidelines repeatedly and on a large scale compared personal data of its employees with those of suppliers, in a bid to uncover possible corruption.

In 2016, Baum joined members of the Green Party, lawyers, a journalist and a doctor in bringing suits against Germany's 2009 antiterrorism law before the Federal Constitutional Court, arguing that covert surveillance, particularly in private homes and in the intimacy of bedrooms or bathrooms, could entangle innocent third parties. In a 6-to-2 vote, the court ruled that the antiterrorism laws were partly unconstitutional and demanded tighter control over surveillance.

In 2022, shortly before the 50th anniversary of the 1972 Munich massacre, Dutch lawyers Carry and Alexander Knoops asked Baum to intervene in the negotiations between the victims’ families and the government of Chancellor Olaf Scholz, which eventually resulted in a compensation offer totalling 28 million euros ($28 million).

Other activities
 Kunststiftung NRW, member of the board of trustees
 Stiftung Menschenrechte, member of the council
 Green Helmets, Member of the Board of Trustees
 Theodor Heuss Foundation, member of the board of trustees
 United Nations Association of Germany (DGVN), member of the presidium
 Stichting Volkswagen Car Claim, president of the advisory board

Recognition
 2009 – Erich-Fromm-Preis

Selected works
Die Finanzkrise und ihre Folgen für die Bevölkerung. Anforderungen an einen verbesserten Verbraucherschutz, in: Robertson-von Trotha, Caroline Y. (ed.): Herausforderung Demokratie. Demokratisch, parlamentarisch, gut? (= Kulturwissenschaft interdisziplinär/Interdisciplinary Studies on Culture and Society, Vol. 6), Baden-Baden 2011
Die Grundrechte im Spannungsverhältnis von Sicherheit und Freiheit, in: Robertson-von Trotha, Caroline Y. (ed.): 60 Jahre Grundgesetz. Interdisziplinäre Perspektiven (= Kulturwissenschaft interdisziplinär/Interdisciplinary Studies on Culture and Society, Vol. 4), Baden-Baden 2009

References

Interior ministers of Germany
1932 births
University of Cologne alumni
Living people
20th-century German lawyers
German people of Russian descent
German people of Polish descent
German people of Ukrainian descent
Commanders Crosses of the Order of Merit of the Federal Republic of Germany
Members of the Bundestag for North Rhine-Westphalia
Members of the Bundestag 1990–1994
Members of the Bundestag 1987–1990
Members of the Bundestag 1983–1987
Members of the Bundestag 1980–1983
Members of the Bundestag 1976–1980
Members of the Bundestag 1972–1976
Parliamentary State Secretaries of Germany
Politicians from Dresden
Politicians from Cologne
21st-century German lawyers